Beersheba is a city in Israel.

Beersheba or similar may also refer to:

Beersheba Springs, Tennessee, a town in Grundy County, Tennessee, United States
Bersabe, ruins of an ancient village in Galilee of Israel
Berseba, a village in the Karas Region of southern Namibia

See also 
Battle of Beersheba (disambiguation)